Bergen Prison is located in the  Bergen kommune in Vestland and is placed under the west Criminal Care department. The prison was opened in 1990 and has a capacity of 258 inmates.

Women and men serve together in Bergen prison, and there have been repeated revelations about female inmates prostituting themselves in exchange for drugs.

References

External links
 Official website

Buildings and structures in Bergen
Prisons in Norway
1990 establishments in Norway